Pill millipedes are any members of two living (and one extinct) orders of millipedes, often grouped together into a single superorder, Oniscomorpha. The name Oniscomorpha refers to the millipedes' resemblance to certain woodlice (Oniscidea), also called pillbugs or "roly-polies". However, millipedes and woodlice are not closely related (belonging to the subphyla Myriapoda and Crustacea, respectively); rather, this is a case of convergent evolution.

Description

Pill millipedes are relatively short-bodied compared to most other millipedes, with only eleven to thirteen body segments, and are capable of rolling into a ball (volvation) when disturbed, as a defense against predators. This ability evolved separately in each of the two orders, making it a case of convergent evolution, rather than homology. They can also exude a noxious liquid, which may be both caustic and toxic, to repel predators. Pill millipedes are detritivorous, feeding on decomposing plant matter, usually in woodlands.

Orders

Glomerida

The order Glomerida is predominantly found in the Northern Hemisphere and includes species such as Glomeris marginata, the common European pill millipede. They have from eleven to twelve body segments, and possess dorsal ozopores (openings of the repugnatorial glands) rather than the lateral ozopores found on many other millipedes. The order contains approximately 450 species found in Europe, South-east Asia and the Americas from California to Guatemala. Four species are present in the British Isles.

Sphaerotheriida

The order Sphaerotheriida is a Gondwana-distribution taxon, with around 350 species in southern Africa, Madagascar, Australasia and South East Asia.  Five species, all in the genus Procyliosoma are present in New Zealand, and around thirty species are present in Australia. Sphaerotheriidans have thirteen body segments, and do not possess repugnatorial glands. Spherotheriidans reach larger size than Glomeridans (up to ), and always possess large, kidney-shaped eyes.

Amynilyspedida
Oniscomorpha also includes the extinct order Amynilyspedida from the upper Carboniferous of North America and Europe. Amynilyspedida differs from the other Oniscomorph orders in having 14–15 segments. The order contains the genus Amynilyspes with unique spines on the tergites, as well as Glomeropsis, Archiscudderia, and Palaeosphaeridium.

References

External links

Millipede taxonomy